Rogers Gulch is a small river in San Mateo County, California.  It contains a small stream which is a tributary of Lobitos Creek.

References

See also
List of watercourses in the San Francisco Bay Area

Valleys of San Mateo County, California
Landforms of the San Francisco Bay Area
Valleys of California